Hafiz (or Hafez) Ibrahim may refer to:

 Hafez Ibrahim (1871–1932), Egyptian poet
 Hafiz Ibrahim Dalliu (1878–1952), Albanian alim
 Hafiz Mohamad Ibrahim (1889-1968), Indian politician
 Hafiz Ibrahim (politician), Bangladeshi politician